Robert Alan Emerson (born 29 May 1957), generally known as Alan Emerson is a British former motorcycle speedway rider.

Born in Haltwhistle, Northumberland, Emerson had second half rides at Workington, Belle Vue, and Teesside before making his competitive debut in 1973 for Teesside Tigers. He also competed regularly in grasstrack. In 1975 he had his first rides in British speedway's top flight with Leicester Lions, the team he also rode for in 1976, doubling up with Teesside. In 1978 he had his first of three seasons with Birmingham Brummies, doubling up in 1979 with Workington Comets and Glasgow Tigers respectively. In 1981 he moved on to Newcastle Diamonds, where he rode for three seasons before retiring from the sport.

References

1957 births
Living people
British speedway riders
English motorcycle racers
Middlesbrough Bears riders
Birmingham Brummies riders
Leicester Lions riders
Workington Comets riders
Glasgow Tigers riders
Newcastle Diamonds riders
Hull Vikings riders
Wolverhampton Wolves riders
Belle Vue Aces riders